Construct-Destruct is the third album by the Belgian electro-industrial act Suicide Commando. The album peaked at #13 on the CMJ RPM Charts in the U.S.

Track listing
"Acid Bath"
"Better Off Dead"
"Putrefaction Process"
"Desire"
"Somnambulist"
"Come To Me (v2.0)"
"The Mirror (re-MASTERed)"
"Pesticide"
"Massacre"
"Ignorance"
"Euthanasia"

Re-Construction
The Re-Construction reissue contains a second disc:

"Decoder (Instrumental Version)"
"Better Off Dead (Remixed By Dive)"
"Desire (SC DNA Swab)"
"Violator"
"Massacre (Exterminate)"
"Better Off Dead (Remixed By Pierrepoint)

References

Suicide Commando albums
1998 albums